William Ingersoll (October 9, 1860 – May 5, 1936) was an American actor on stage, in musical theatre and in film. During a career spanning over five decades, he played more than 800 roles on stage. After performing in his first silent motion picture in 1920, he appeared in a handful of "talkies" in the 1930s, playing mainly character roles such as doctors, judges and a police commissioner.

Early life 
William Ingersoll was born in Lafayette, Indiana to a physician father, in a family that had never produced any actors; most of his relatives were shocked when, as a boy, he considered acting as a career, on the suggestion of his elder brother. He studied mining engineering at the Colorado School of Mines in Denver after graduating from Purdue University, where he made such an impression in The Pirates of Penzance that friends urged him to become an actor.

Career 
Ingersoll joined the Boston Museum Company in 1882, where he remained for five years. In the beginning, he divided his time between acting and supporting the company as a backstage hand and general utility man, eventually making his first professional appearance as a fully fledged actor in 1885. He performed with Marie Wainwright in Twelfth Night at Palmer's Theatre in New York and went on tour with her for three seasons; she rated Ingersoll as "the best leading man on the American stage."

In 1894, Ingersoll joined the summer stock theatre company that James F. Neill and R.L. Giffen had organized at the Manhattan Beach, Denver. In September of the same year, he joined the first winter stock company that Neill and Giffen also organized at the Lyceum Theatre, Denver. When T. Daniel Frawley—who had placed another company in Salt Lake City in December 1894—later purchased the Neill-Giffen interests and moved the organization to San Francisco, Ingersoll remained on the roster of the combined Denver and Salt Lake City company.

Ingersoll then married and left the stage, but resumed his acting career after his wife's death. He first joined the Nat Goodwin Company, with whom he performed in In Mizzoura when it opened at the Baldwin Theatre in San Francisco in June 1896; immediately after the play closed, the whole company sailed to Australia on June 25. Ingersoll remained with the Goodwin company for a period that included four seasons in Australia. In addition to performing with the Nat Goodwin company, Ingersoll played in the supporting companies of Mary Shaw, William H. Crane, Marie Cahill and Charles Richman.

He played leading parts at the Grand Opera House in Pittsburgh, Pennsylvania, and at the Chestnut Street Theatre in Philadelphia, Pennsylvania. He acted in many roles as a visiting star in Columbus, Cincinnati, at the Elitch Theatre in Denver, Colorado, and in Washington, D.C., Providence, Rhode Island, Richmond, Virginia, Salt Lake City, and on Broadway, among many others. He performed with stars of the period, such as Margaret Maher, Ethel Barrymore, Mrs. Fiske, and William DeWolf Hopper. In 1928–1929, he played in Brothers at the 48th Street Theatre in New York, learning his part perfectly in two days, one of the instances of his exceptional memory; this was the 821st he had learned.

After appearing on stage for 55 years and trying his hand in a silent film in 1920, he progressed into sound films in the 1930s, and one of his final talkies was Little Lord Fauntleroy (1936), in which he played the role of the Doctor.

Personal life 
At the time of his death in 1936, Ingersoll was married to Mabel Tate, and they had a daughter, Mrs Ira Minnick.

Memberships 
Ingersoll was elected to The Lambs Theatre Club in 1893, and was also a member of The Players Club and of the council of the Actors' Equity Association.

Selected works

Stage 

In the table below, all theatres are located in New York, NY, except where indicated.

Film 
 Partners of the Night (1920), as Police Commissioner Thorne
 The Cheat (1931), as Croupier
 Fifi (1933), as Uncle
 Mary Burns, Fugitive (1935), as Judge
 Whipsaw (1935), as Dr. Williams
 Little Lord Fauntleroy (1936), as the Doctor
 Half Angel (1936), as Judge
 And Sudden Death (1936), as Judge

Explanatory footnotes

References

Citations

Sources

Books

Newspapers

Theatre programs/playbills

Websites

External links 
 
 
 
 
 William Ingersoll as Dr. Williams in Whipshaw (1935)

1860 births
1936 deaths
19th-century American male actors
19th-century American male singers
19th-century American singers
19th-century American dancers
20th-century American male actors
20th-century American male singers
20th-century American singers
20th-century American dancers
American male musical theatre actors
American male stage actors
American male film actors
Vaudeville performers
Members of The Lambs Club